Escadron de Transport 55 Ouessant is a French Air and Space Force squadron located at Léon-Mba International Airport, Libreville, Gabon which operates the Eurocopter Fennec.

In the 1970s ETOM 55 (Escadron de Transport d'Outre Mer 55) operated the Nord Noratlas transport aircraft from Dakar, Senegal.

See also

 List of French Air and Space Force aircraft squadrons

References

French Air and Space Force squadrons